Lisa Lashes (born Lisa Dawn Rose-Wyatt on 23 April 1971 in Coventry, England), is an English electronic dance music DJ and music producer known for mixing numerous Euphoria albums and for her Lashed dance music events.
She has headlined European and international music festivals such as Global Gathering, Creamfields, Nocturnal Wonderland and Dance Valley, UK events such as Godskitchen, Gatecrasher, Inside Out and Planet Love and has toured China, Canada, US, Russia, Australia and New Zealand.

Personal life
Lisa Dawn Rose-Wyatt was born in Holbrooks, Coventry, where she grew up with her mother, father, three sisters and two brothers. Raised as a Jehovah's Witness, on Sundays, Lisa would attend meetings and knock on neighbors' doors with her parents to hand out The Watchtower and occasionally read from the Bible. In her early years, Lisa went to John Shelton School, then to President Kennedy Comprehensive School and at 16, joined a 2-year youth training scheme with Marks & Spencer, where she continued to climb up the ladder for eight years.

Lisa first discovered a passion for dance music when she began clubbing at legendary events such as Miss Moneypenny's and Chuff Chuff where she got to see her favorite DJs of that time: Lisa Loud, John Kelly and the late Tony De Vit.

1993–2003: Early 
Lisa Lashes first emerged as a DJ in 1992. In 1995, she performed at a friend's boat party, where she met Sundissential promoter Paul Madan or 'Madders' she got offered the second official advertisement to continue residency at the Sunday club in Birmingham.

Tidy Boys needed Lisa Lashes to help steal Tidy Trax by fronting the relaunch studio project's "The Tidy Girls EP" alongside Rachel Auburn, Lisa Pin-Up and Anne Savage.

Her single release, "Unbelievable" (2000) spent one week at No. 63 in the UK Singles Chart in July that year. In October 2003, "What Can You Do 4 Me?" peaked at number 52 in the same chart.

In 2000 Lisa Lashes was voted by readers of DJ Magazine in their annual top 100 list of the most popular DJs, the first and only female to date, to be among the top ten DJs in the world.

2003–2010: The Launch of Lashed
In 2003, Lisa Lashes launched her 'Lashed events' in Ibiza influenced by the Tidy Trax Sound. Having held residencies in Ibiza for several years, playing Godskitchen, Judgement Sundays, Slinky, and Tonic, Lisa wanted to create something completely unique and so for 15 weeks in summer 2003, Lashed in Ibiza took over iconic nightclub 'Eden' in the heart of the San Antonio waterfront and it quickly became a sell out event. To bring Lashed to a global audience, Lisa teamed up with Nettwerk Management to promote Lashed as a premiere dance music event taking Lashed to China, Canada, America, Netherlands, Australia, New Zealand, and Japan.

2010–Present: Transition to trance and techno
Lisa Lashes launched her trance-based Lashed Podcast on iTunes and her website in April 2010. The monthly podcast garnered 90,000 subscribers within the first year. Lisa Lashes then began producing trance music with her debut release 'Election Day' being signed to Marcel Woods' Musical Madness label. She went on to release on labels such as Discover Dark, High Contrast, Reset Records and her own Lashed Music label, some of which received support from leading trance artists Armin van Buuren, Paul van Dyk and Judge Jules. Since her transition to trance music Lisa has performed at major trance events such as A State of Trance 550 in Den Bosch, Holland, Nocturnal Wonderland in California and Gatecrasher in Shanghai, she continues to tour and perform worldwide.

Discography

Albums and compilations
 Slinky (1999)
 Hard House Euphoria Volume 1 (2000)
 Lashed! (2000)
 The Tidy Girls Annual (2001)
 Extreme Euphoria Volume 1 (2002)
 Extreme Euphoria Volume 2 (2002)
 Extreme Euphoria Volume 3 (2003)
 Extreme Euphoria Volume 4 (2003)
 Get Lashed in Australia (2004)
 Summer Bangers (2004)
 Lashed (2005)
 Lashed Euphoria (2006)
 The Very Best of Extreme Euphoria (2007)
 Lisa Lashes (2007)
 Goodgreef Xtra Hard (2009)
 Hard Dance Icons 003 (2010)

Singles and EPs
 Tidy Girls EP (1999, Tidy Trax)
 Sundissential EP (1999, Tidy Trax)
 Unbelievable / Dance 2 The House (Don't Go)'' (2000, Tidy Trax)
 Lookin' Good (2000, Tidy Trax)
 Unbelievable (2000, Tidy Trax)
 What Can You Do 4 Me? (2003, Tidy Trax)
 Desire (2005, Gravity Trapp)
 Deadbeat (2005, Riot! Recordings)
 Can't Sleep (2007, Lashed Music)
 Always Faithful (2007, Lashed Music)
 Lashed Track (2008, Lashed Music)
 Zipp It! (2008, Lashed Music)
 Has It Come To This? (2009, Lashed Music)
 Nu Religion (2009, Kiddfectious)
 Disarray (2009, Lashed Music)
 Bondage & Whips (2009, Lashed Music)
 Dancefloor Orgy (2010, Lashed Music)
 Release Me (2010, Siren Trax)
 Bring on In / 12 Hours in Brixton (2010, Discover Dark)
 Lashed Theme (2010, Lashed Music)
 Election Day (2010, Musical Madness)
 F33L (2010, Lashed Music)
 Hold Tight (2010, Lashed Music)
 Emotions (2010, Lashed Music)
 52 Degrees (2011, Reset Records)
 High Vision (2011, High Contrast)
 Numero Uno (2011)
 Mandala (2011)
 The Bends (2011)
 Illusionize (2011)
 Snapshot (2012)
 Interconnect (2012)
 Harmonic Degree (2013)
 Topaz (2013)
 Wanted To Feel (2013, Lashed Music)
 Kaleidoscope (2013, Fraction Records)
 ARPwave (2014, Pharmacy)
 Virus (2014 Fraction Records)
 What You Know (2014)
– exclusive to Social Deconstruction
 Mind Control (2012, Lashed Music)

References

External links
 – official site

1971 births
Living people
21st-century English women musicians
English record producers
British women record producers
English women DJs
Musicians from Coventry
People from Nuneaton
Electronic dance music DJs